South Korean boy band NU'EST has released four studio albums, eight EPs, two compilation albums, and sixteen singles.

Albums

Studio albums

Compilation albums

Extended plays

Singles

As lead artist

As collaborating artist

Soundtrack appearances

Other charting songs

Music videos

Notes

References

NU'EST
Discographies of South Korean artists
K-pop music group discographies